Zhang Xixiang (张惜香 born 27 May 1978) is a Chinese weightlifter.

She competed at the 1995 World Weightlifting Championships winning a silver medal, and 1996 World Weightlifting Championships, winning a gold medal.

References 

1978 births
Chinese female weightlifters
Living people
20th-century Chinese women